Empire Balham was a 1,061 ton cargo ship which was built by G Brown & Co (Marine) Ltd, Greenock in 1944 for the Ministry of War Transport (MoWT). She was sold to Queenship Navigation Ltd in 1946 and renamed Nordic Queen. In 1958 she was sold to the Maldavian National Shipping Corp (Ceylon) Ltd and renamed Maldive Star, serving for a further fourteen years until scrapped in 1967.

History
Empire Balham was built by G Brown & Co (Marine) Ltd, Greenock as yard number 232. She was launched on 18 November 1944 and completed in December 1944. She was initially operated under the management of British Channel Islands Shipping Co Ltd.

War service
Empire Balham was a member of a number of convoys during the Second World War

COC 173
Convoy COC 173 sailed from Falmouth, on 22 May 1945 and arrived at Granville, Manche on  23 May.

Postwar
In 1946, Empire Balham was sold to Queenship Navigation Ltd, London and renamed Nordic Queen. In 1958, Nordic Queen was sold to the Maldavian National Shipping Corp (Ceylon) Ltd, and renamed Maldive Star. In June 1959, Ceylon sent a shipment of arms to the Maldives. Ibrahim Nasir led an expedition of hundreds of armed men aboard the Maldive Star to the Fua Mulaku and Huvadhu Atolls during the Suvadive Rebellion of 1963. Maldive Star served with Maldavian National for fourteen years. Maldive Star was scrapped in December 1972 at Gadani Beach, Karachi, Pakistan.

Official number and code letters
Official Numbers were a forerunner to IMO Numbers.

Empire Balham and Nordic Queen had the UK Official Number 169522. Empire Balham used the Code Letters GDTL.

References

External links
 Photo of SS Nordic Queen

1944 ships
Ships built on the River Clyde
Steamships of the United Kingdom
Empire ships
Ministry of War Transport ships
Merchant ships of the United Kingdom
Steamships of Sri Lanka
Merchant ships of Sri Lanka